The eleventh season of the series Show Me the Money (known as Show Me the Money 11: The New One) premiered on October 21, 2022. It aired every Friday at 23:00 (KST) on Mnet. The season featured four new producer teams in Lil Boi & GroovyRoom, Jay Park & Slom, The Quiett & Leellamarz, and Justhis & R. Tee.

Auditions in South Korea were held from July 1 to 30, 2022. There are also auditions held in Los Angeles, United States on August 13 and 14 the same year, with Jay Park and Justhis the judges for this particular audition. This marked the show's first auditions in the United States after 5 years, when it was done for Season 6. The season saw about more than 30,000 applicants, the highest number throughout the series.

Lee Young-ji is announced as the winner of the season, with Jay Park x Slom being the winning team. She will receive ₩100,000,000 in prize money, plus first class air ticket and accommodation stay in Beverly Hills, worth ₩100,000,000 in total. Lee also became the first female contestant and former High School Rapper winner to win the series.

Judges
Team Lil Boi x GroovyRoom
 Lil Boi: Rapper and former CEO, under his own label Halftime Records, and is one half of the rap duo Geeks. Previously, as a contestant, he participated in Season 4, and in Season 9 where he was crowned the winner of the season.
 GroovyRoom: Producer duo composed of Park Gyu-jeong and Lee Hwi-min. Founder of their own label AREA and is also currently signed under H1ghr Music. Previously participated in Season 9 as part of Team GroovyRoom x Justhis.

Team Jay Park x Slom
 Jay Park: Rapper, singer, and current CEO of More Vision. Also a former CEO of AOMG and H1ghr Music. Previously participated in Seasons 4 and 6 as producer for Team AOMG
 Slom: Producer who is currently signed under Zion.T's label Standard Friends. Member of HOLOCOIN. Previously participated in Season 10 as a producer under Team Tsla.

Team The Quiett x Leellamarz
 The Quiett: CEO and rapper currently signed under Daytona Records. Also a former CEO of the defunct Illionaire Records. Previously participated in Seasons 3 (where he was the winning producer for Team Illionaire), 5 and 7 (as member of Team Illionaire Ambition).
 Leellamarz: Rapper currently signed under Ambition Musik. Previously participated in season 5 as a contestant.

Team R. Tee x Justhis
 R. Tee: Producer currently signed under The Black Label.
 Justhis: Rapper currently signed under GROOVL1N. Previously participated in season 9 as a producer under Team GroovyRoom x Justhis.

Teams
The Producer Team line-ups were formed during the 60-Second Team Rapper Casting round, in which eleven members per team were selected.

Team Jay Park x Slom (also known as Slay)
 Lee Young-ji – Winner of High School Rapper 3. Previously took part in Good Girl.
 Jambino – Signed under 8BallTown. Previously participated in season 9 as a member of Team CodePalo.
 Toigo – Member of Under Seongsu Bridge (USB) crew. Previously participated in seasons 9 and 10.
 Xinsayne – Signed under Doubleduvett. Previously participated in season 10 under his real name Shin Yong-joon.
 J'Kyun – Former member of Lucky J. Previously participated in seasons 2, 5 and 6 as J'Kyun and season 8 and 9 as the masked rapper Cox Billy.
 Park Myung-hoon – Known as Kambo. Signed under GBG. Previously participated in Drop The Bit.
 Takewon – Signed under Halftime Records. Previously participated in season 1.
 Justin Park – Korean-American rapper. Signed under 5A Label. 
 Koo Bon-gyeom – Known as RB Nine. Member of Mighty Lynx crew.
 Yanu – Formerly signed under Halftime Records. Previously participated in seasons 8, 9 and 10.
 Hoongyo – N/A

Team R. Tee x Justhis (also known as R. Jus)
 Huh – Signed under Amoeba Culture. Previously participated in seasons 8 and 9 as Rose de Penny (Heo Sung-hyun).
 Don Malik – Signed under Ambition Musik. Member of Doppelgängem crew.
 Khan – Member of NFL crew. Previously participated in season 9 and Drop The Bit.
 Los – Korean-American rapper. Signed under VMC. Previously participated in seasons 6 and 7.
 Mckdaddy – Member of Vagabonds Tribe. Previously participated in seasons 7, 8 and 9.
 Unofficialboyy – Member of D.O.G crew. Previously participated in seasons 4, 5, 7, 8 and 10, and High School Rapper.
 Lee Seo-jin – Known as Dam1noise. Signed under Navyl1ne. 
 Jo Chae-hyun – N/A
 Neuns –  N/A
 Rolldice – Korean-American rapper.
 Lee Seul-yi – Known as 2Da.

Team The Quiett x Leellamarz (also known as Quiolin)
 NSW Yoon – Signed under Talented. 
 QM – Signed under VMC.
 Crucial Star – Signed under his own label Starry Nightt Music. Previously participated in seasons 4 and 9.
 Damini – Rookie rapper. Signed under Minefield.
 Kim Jae-wook – N/A
 Kim Do-yoon – N/A
 Song Jin-woo – N/A
 Woolenciah – N/A
 Max Kim – Previously participated in Drop The Bit.
 Street Baby – Previously participated in season 9 under his real name Lee Gi-wook. Formerly known as xscapeway or XS.
 J4 Prada – Independent rookie rapper.

Team Lil Boi x GroovyRoom (also known as Grillz)
 Blase – Previously participated in seasons 7, 8, 9 and 10.
 Roh Yun-ha – Signed under Mine Field. Previously participated in High School Rapper 4 (1st runner up) and Drop The Bit (Winner).
 Chillin Homie – Signed under Mine Field. Member of NFL crew. Previously participated in seasons 7, 8 and 9.
 Fleeky Bang – Signed under Yellin Records.
 Polodared – Previously participated in season 10 under his real name Choi Sang-hyun, and Drop The Bit.
 Kitsyojii – Signed under LBNC. Previously participated in seasons 8, 9 and 10.
 YLN Foreign – Signed under Uncutpoint. Previously participated in High School Rapper 4 and Drop The Bit.
 Goneisback – N/A 
 Digital Dav – Korean-American rapper. Signed under Xyber Studios.
 Lee Jun-seo – N/A
 Cho Terry – Previously participated in season 10.

Rounds

Round One: Rapper Selection Round
For the Korea audition, this season marked the return of the stadium auditions, where contestants will register at the venue and take part in Round One on the same day. As a safety precaution from the COVID-19 pandemic, the contestants will be divided into small groups, with each contestant socially distanced from one another, and have a plexiglass placed between him/her and the assigned producer. Each contestant will perform a short a cappella rap in front of the producer. The producer then provide an in-depth evaluation of the contestant, and determine if they advanced to the next round. Similar to the previous two seasons, the contestant will grab the chain at the corner of the plexiglass if he/she passes the round.

A total of 108 contestants, including 5 from the Los Angeles audition, moved on to Round Two.

Contestants from the Rapper Selection Round

Round Two: 60-second Team Rapper Casting
This round would be done in two parts. For the first part, the 108 contestants who moved on from Round One will each have to do a one minute rap in front of all judges. If all four producer teams failed the contestant, the beat stops and the contestant is eliminated from the show. Contestants who received at least one pass can proceed for Team Casting, where he/she chooses one of the team(s) that had passed him/her. However, during the Team Casting, the producer teams can eliminate contestants, such that each producer team would have only 11 contestants. After this round, 44 contestants moved on to Round Three, with 11 contestants in each producer team.

Contestants at the 60-Second Beat Rap

Results of Team Casting

 Indicates the contestants who were eliminated.

Round Three: Guerilla Beat Cypher
This round features no beats played by the DJ, instead there would be two drummers/percussionists playing the drums and percussions live for original beats without melody, a first in the Show Me The Money series. On the stage there are two microphones, one lighted in blue and one lighted in red. The grabbing of those microphones are of a first-come, first-serve basis. One contestant would be on stage to grab whichever microphone that lights up first, and start his/her rap performance. After that, another contestant grabs the second microphone that lights up and start his/her rap performance. The beat ends when the contestant with the second microphone ends his/her rap performance. A total of 22 matchups are formed. The producer judges and some invited contestants who were eliminated earlier in the first and second rounds vote for the winner of each matchup. After this round, three contestants from each team would be eliminated.

Guerilla Beat Cypher Matchups

 Indicates the winning contestant.
 Indicates the losing contestant.

Results of Guerilla Beat Cypher

 Indicates the contestants who were eliminated.

Round Four: Team Crew Battle
In this round, each producer team would be split into two crews of four contestants each, one crew being the Real crew and the other being the Fake crew. Each crew would choose a beat from their respective producer team, and perform together. After each producer team's crews perform, the winning crew is decided. The winning crew will have all its members advancing to the next round, while the losing crew will eliminate 2 of its members.

Crews for Team Crew Battle

Names in bold represent the leaders of the crews.
 Indicates the winning crew.
 Indicates the losing crew.
 Indicates the contestants who were eliminated.

Round Five: Team Song Mission
In this round, during preparations for the mission, for each team, the producers would decide on one contestant that would be eliminated at the point, and the remaining five contestants would perform together with their producers. Unlike previous seasons, the performances will be held in front of a live audience. At the end of each performance, the producers of the performing producer team would eliminate one contestant. Similar to the previous season, the eliminated contestant after the performance will still be part of the official release version of the song and will be included in this season's discography.

Contestants eliminated before performance for Team Song Mission

Round five result

 Indicates the contestants who were eliminated.

Round Six: Team Diss Battle
For this round, in each battle, there would be two one-on-one diss battles and one four-on-four diss battle. After each battle, the live audience would vote to decide which team would be the winning team. The winning team will have all contestants moving on to the next round, while the losing team will have to eliminate one contestant.

 Indicates the winning team, with all its contestants advancing to the next round.
 Indicates the winning contestant/team of the battle.
 Indicates the losing contestant/team of the battle.
 Indicates the contestants who were eliminated.

Round Seven: First Live Performances
For this round, winning teams of the previous round would go against each other and losing teams of the previous round would go against each other. All 4 producer teams would hold the mic selection for two of their own contestants to determine who would perform at the live stage; one contestant from each producer team would be eliminated. For each matchup, through two rounds of voting, the winner would be decided. The teams with the lesser money cumulated will each have to eliminate one contestant.

 Indicates the winning contestant of the matchup.
 Indicates the contestants who were eliminated.

Result of First Performances

 Indicates the winning team.
 Indicates the contestants who were eliminated.

Round Eight: Semi-final Performances
For this round, the matchups are decided based on the contestants of Team Grillz (the team with the most cumulated money in the previous round) each picking their opponents, followed by Don Malik (who was on Team R. Jus which has the second most cumulated money in the previous round) picking his opponent, and the remaining two not picked would automatically be matched up. For each matchup, through two rounds of voting, the winner would be decided. The contestant with more money would advance to the final, while the other contestant would be eliminated.

 Indicates the winning contestant of the matchup.
 Indicates the contestants who were eliminated.

Round Nine: Final Performances (Live Episode)
The final round will be televised live, and the winner of the season is decided based from the votes from both the live audience and live SMS voting. The four finalists will meet up prior at a undisclosed location to determine their order of performances. The final round will be divided into two parts: the first part of the finals featured all four finalists each having a performance with special guest performer(s) as featuring. After all four finalists performed, a two-round voting process from both the live audience and live SMS voting will be held, and the performance ranking based on the live audience will be announced. In the second part of the finals, the four finalists will each perform with their producer(s) and/or special guest performer(s) featuring, with the same two-round voting process and announcement of performance ranking held after the final performances. The contestant who earned the most cumulative performance money from both the pre-finals online evaluation team voters and live SMS voters in all two performances will be the season's champion, will receive ₩100,000,000 in prize money, plus first class air ticket and accommodation stay in Beverly Hills, worth ₩100,000,000 in total. The final episode will also include a special performance from eliminated contestants, with the song to be included in this season's official discography.

 Indicates winner of Show Me the Money 11
 Indicates the 1st runner-up
 Indicates the 2nd and 3rd runner-ups

Show Me the Money 11 Top 24

Discography

Controversy
 In Round Three, Lee Young-ji was given a chance to rap although she failed to grab the microphone in the 22 rounds. This sparked controversy with viewers complaining that the production team gave preferential treatment to her.

Notes

References

2022 South Korean television seasons
Show Me the Money (South Korean TV series)